The 2018 Ferrari Challenge North America is the 24th season of Ferrari Challenge North America. The season consisted of 7 rounds, starting at the Daytona International Speedway on January 27 and ending at the Autodromo Nazionale Monza on November 3.

Calendar

Entry list
All teams and drivers used the Ferrari 488 Challenge fitted with Pirelli tyres.

Trofeo Pirelli

Coppa Shell

Results and standings

Race results

Championship standings
Points were awarded to the top ten classified finishers as follows:

Trofeo Pirelli

Coppa Shell

See also
 2018 Finali Mondiali

References

External links
 Official website

North America 2018
Ferrari Challenge North America